Egyházaskesző is a village in Veszprém county, Hungary.

Notable people
 Arpad Elo, mathematician

References

Populated places in Veszprém County